Yukon Vengeance is a 1954 American Northern film directed by William Beaudine and starring Kirby Grant, Monte Hale and Mary Ellen Kay. It was the tenth and final film featuring Grant as Mountie Corporal Rod Webb, assisted by his dog Chinook.

Plot
A police mountie investigates a series of murders connected to robberies of the payroll at a lumber camp in Yukon, he then decides to act as courier for the next shipment himself.

Cast
 Kirby Grant as Corporal Rod Webb, Royal Canadian Mounted Police
 Monte Hale as Jim Barclay 
 Mary Ellen Kay as Madelon Duval 
 Henry Kulky as Schmidt 
 Carol Thurston as Yellow Flower 
 Parke MacGregor as Fergus MacLish 
 Fred Gabourie as Grey Shadow 
 Billy Wilkerson as Chief Lone Eagle 
 Marshall Bradford as The Commissioner  
 Chinook as Chinook, Webb's Dog

See also
 Trail of the Yukon (1949)
 The Wolf Hunters (1949)
 Snow Dog (1950)
 Call of the Klondike (1950)
 Northwest Territory (1951)
 Yukon Manhunt (1951)
 Yukon Gold (1952)
 Fangs of the Arctic (1953)
 Northern Patrol (1953)
 Yukon Vengeance (1954)

References

Bibliography
 Marshall, Wendy L. William Beaudine: From Silents to Television. Scarecrow Press, 2005.

External links
 

1954 films
1954 Western (genre) films
Allied Artists films
American Western (genre) films
American black-and-white films
Corporal Rod Webb (film series)
1950s English-language films
Films based on works by James Oliver Curwood
Films directed by William Beaudine
Films set in Yukon
Northern (genre) films
Royal Canadian Mounted Police in fiction
1950s American films